The Coming Days is a 2010 German drama film with a dystopian vision of the near future directed by Lars Kraume. It is set in the time period from 2012 to 2020, which the film portrays as an era of increasing social and international instability.

Cast 
 Bernadette Heerwagen as Laura Kuper
 Daniel Brühl as Hans Krämer
 August Diehl as Konstantin Richter
 Johanna Wokalek as Cecilia Kuper
 Ernst Stötzner as Walter Kuper
 Susanne Lothar as Martha Kuper
 Vincent Redetzki as Philip Kuper
 Mehdi Nebbou as Vincent
 Jürgen Vogel as Melzer
 Tina Engel as Oberärztin

References

External links 

2010 drama films
2010 films
German drama films
2010s German films
2010s German-language films